Louise of Stolberg-Gedern (13 October 1764 – 24 May 1834), was a German noblewoman, by birth member of the House of Stolberg and by her two marriages Duchess of Saxe-Meiningen and Württemberg.

Early life
Born in Gedern, she was the second child of Christian Karl, Prince of Stolberg-Gedern (1725-1764) and his wife Countess Eleonore of Reuss-Lobenstein (1736-1782). She was born three months after her father's death, on 21 July 1764.

Marriages and issue
In Gedern on 5 June 1780, Louise married firstly Karl Wilhelm, Duke of Saxe-Meiningen. Their childless  union lasted only two years until Karl Wilhelm's death, on 21 July 1782.

Five years later, on 21 January 1787 in Meiningen, Louise married secondly Duke Eugen, the third child of Frederick II Eugene, Duke of Württemberg and brother of King Frederick I of Württemberg. They had five children:

Duke Frederick Eugen Karl Paul Ludwig of Württemberg (Oleśnica [Öls], 18 January 1788 – Carlsruhe [Pokój], Silesia, 16 September 1857), married in 1817 to Princess Mathilde of Waldeck and Pyrmont, had issue; Married secondly in 1827 to Princess Helene of Hohenlohe-Langenburg, had issue.
Duchess Friederike Sophie Dorothea Marie Luise  of Württemberg (Oleśnica, 4 June 1789 – Slawentzitz, 26 June 1851), married in 1811 to Friedrich August Karl, Prince of Hohenlohe-Oehringen, had issue. 
Duke Frederick Karl Georg Ferdinand of Württemberg (Oleśnica, 15 June 1790 – Oleśnica, 25 December 1795).
Duke Karl Frederick Heinrich of Württemberg (Oleśnica, 13 December 1792 – Carlsruhe, 28 November 1797).
Duke Frederick Paul Wilhelm of Württemberg (Carlsruhe, 25 June 1797 – Mergentheim, 25 November 1860), married in 1827 to Princess Maria Sophia of Thurn and Taxis, had issue.

Louise died in Carlsruhe (now Pokój), Silesia, aged sixty-nine, having survived her second husband and two of her children.

References

1764 births
1834 deaths
House of Stolberg
House of Saxe-Meiningen
House of Württemberg
Remarried royal consorts